Mario Rottaris (born February 8, 1968) is a former Swiss professional ice hockey centre who played for HC Fribourg-Gottéron in Switzerland's Nationalliga A.

Rottaris has participated as a member of the Swiss national team in numerous international tournaments, including the 1992 Winter Olympics.

Career statistics

References

External links

1968 births
Living people
Swiss ice hockey centres
Ice hockey players at the 1992 Winter Olympics
Olympic ice hockey players of Switzerland
HC Fribourg-Gottéron players